San Marcos Municipality may refer to:
 San Marcos, Sucre, Colombia
 San Marcos, El Salvador
 San Marcos, Guatemala
 San Marcos Municipality, Jalisco, Mexico
 San Marcos Municipality, Guerrero, Mexico

Municipality name disambiguation pages